The 1989–90 All-Ireland Senior Club Hurling Championship was the 20th staging of the All-Ireland Senior Club Hurling Championship, the Gaelic Athletic Association's premier inter-county club hurling tournament. The championship began on 24 September 1989 and ended on 17 March 1990.

Buffer's Alley were the defending champions, however, they failed to qualify for the championship.

On 17 March 1990, Ballyhale Shamrocks won the championship following a 1-16 to 0-16 defeat of Ballybrown in the All-Ireland final. This was their third All-Ireland title overall and their first in six championship seasons.

Results

Connacht Senior Club Hurling Championship

Semi-final

Final

Leinster Senior Club Hurling Championship

First round

Quarter-finals

Semi-finals

Final

Munster Senior Club Hurling Championship

Quarter-finals

Semi-finals

Final

Ulster Senior Club Hurling Championship

Semi-final

Final

All-Ireland Senior Club Hurling Championship

Quarter-final

Semi-finals

Final

Championship statistics

Top scorers

Top scorers overall

Top scorers in a single game

References

1989 in hurling
1990 in hurling
All-Ireland Senior Club Hurling Championship